Eudora is a city in Douglas County, Kansas, United States, along the Kansas and Wakarusa rivers.  As of the 2020 census, the population of the city was 6,408.

History 
The Eudora area was home to various Native American tribes for thousands of years. The Kansa tribe lived in the Eudora area from the 1600s to the early 1800s. The Kansa lived along the rivers of this region in villages and practiced agriculture. A Kansa village was located at the site of modern day Eudora in the 1790s. In the 1820s the Kansa were forcibly removed from the region by the U.S. government to make room for the Shawnee tribe. The Oregon Trail and Santa Fe Trail passed through the region, just a few miles south of modern Eudora.

In 1854 the Kansas–Nebraska Act was passed, creating the Kansas Territory and opening the region to settlement by Americans. As a result of the Kansas–Nebraska Act, Americans settlers started to encroach upon Indian lands. In 1856, three members of a German Immigrant Settlement Company (called Deutsche-Neusiedlungsverein) from Chicago, sent out a location committee to choose a town site in the new Kansas Territory. Favoring the Eudora area, they drew up contracts with Shawnee Chief Paschal Fish, the original owner of the town site. The new town was named Eudora in honor of Chief Fish's daughter. The first post office in Eudora was established in September, 1857. Eudora was incorporated in 1859.

Eudora was the site of conflict during the Bleeding Kansas Era and the American Civil War. Eudora strongly supported the Union during the Civil War, many of its men enlisted to defeat the Confederacy. William Quantrill passed through the Eudora area in 1863 on his way to Lawrence, Kansas to commit his infamous and deadly raid on the unsuspecting town. Several Eudora residents attempted to warn Lawrence of Quantrill's proximity, but two men were thrown from their horses, one of them dying as a result of his injuries. After the raid, Eudorans were quick to aid the citizens of Lawrence as they started their recovery.

After the Civil War, relative stability finally arrived to the region. Eudora grew rapidly in the late 19th century, In the 1860s, a small Jewish community was based in Eudora. In the late 1800s, a sizeable African American community was based in Eudora, as much as 25% of the Eudora community was Black in 1870. Growth in Eudora leveled in the early 20th century. In the recent decades, Eudora has again grown tremendously as a result of its proximity to Lawrence and Kansas City and its location along Kansas Highway 10.

Geography
Eudora is located at  (38.938213, −95.097417).

Demographics

Eudora is part of the Lawrence, Kansas Metropolitan Statistical Area.

2010 census
As of the census of 2010, there were 6,136 people, 2,210 households, and 1,600 families living in the city. The racial makeup of the city was 93.3% White, 0.8% African American, 1.6% Native American, 0.7% Asian, 0.8% from other races, and 2.8% from two or more races. Hispanic or Latino of any race were 4.5% of the population.

There were 2,210 households, of which 44.2% had children under the age of 18 living with them, 57.5% were married couples living together, 10.6% had a female householder with no husband present, 4.3% had a male householder with no wife present, and 27.6% were non-families. 22.8% of all households were made up of individuals, and 7.7% had someone living alone who was 65 years of age or older. The average household size was 2.75 and the average family size was 3.25.

The median age in the city was 31.8 years. 31% of residents were under the age of 18; 7.1% were between the ages of 18 and 24; 32.1% were from 25 to 44; 20.9% were from 45 to 64; and 8.8% were 65 years of age or older. The gender makeup of the city was 49.5% male and 50.5% female.

2000 census
As of the census of 2000, there were 4,307 people, 1,607 households, and 1,136 families living in the city. The racial makeup of the city was 94.87% White, 0.70% African American, 1.46% Native American, 0.49% Asian, 0.02% Pacific Islander, 0.67% from other races, and 1.79% from two or more races. Hispanic or Latino of any race were 2.39% of the population.

There were 1,607 households, out of which 40.2% had children under the age of 18 living with them, 53.8% were married couples living together, 12.6% had a female householder with no husband present, and 29.3% were non-families. 23.5% of all households were made up of individuals, and 8.0% had someone living alone who was 65 years of age or older. The average household size was 2.63 and the average family size was 3.13.

In the city, the population was spread out, with 30.7% under the age of 18, 8.8% from 18 to 24, 34.1% from 25 to 44, 15.9% from 45 to 64, and 10.5% who were 65 years of age or older. The median age was 31 years. For every 100 females, there were 88.2 males. For every 100 females age 18 and over, there were 84.5 males.

The median income for a household in the city was $41,713, and the median income for a family was $50,909. Males had a median income of $37,833 versus $25,202 for females. The per capita income for the city was $18,693. About 4.3% of families and 6.4% of the population were below the poverty line, including 5.6% of those under age 18 and 7.9% of those age 65 or over.

Government
The Eudora government consists of five City Commissioners, which elects the Mayor.  The City Commission meets the second and fourth Monday of each month at 7PM.
 City Hall, 4 East 7th St.

Representation
 Republican Jake LaTurner in Kansas' 2nd Congressional District
 Democrat Tom Holland in the State Senate. 
 Republican Lance Neelly in the State House of Representatives.
 Democrat Shannon Reid in the Douglas County Commission.

Education
The community is served by Eudora USD 491 public school district.

Transportation
Eudora is directly served by three state highways, three county highways and a direct route to one national highway and to one interstate highway:

Notable people
 Chase Austin, NASCAR driver
 Mitch Ballock, basketball player at Creighton University
 Debra Barnes, 1968 Miss America
 Hugh Beaumont, actor
 Vic Edelbrock, manufacturer, automotive engineer
 Charles Parham, founder of Pentacostalism, presided over Methodist Church services from 1892 to 1894.

See also
 Beni Israel Cemetery, added to the National Register of Historic Places list in January 2013
 Eudora Kaw River Bridge, bridge over the Kansas River about 0.5 mile north of Eudora

References

Further reading

External links
 
 Eudora - Directory of Public Officials
 The Eudora News, local newspaper
 Eudora Reporter, Eudora news and information
 Eudora city map, KDOT

Cities in Kansas
Cities in Douglas County, Kansas